The Cowboy Millionaire may refer to:

 The Cowboy Millionaire (1909 film), an American silent short Western
 The Cowboy Millionaire (1935 film), an American Western film